Be More is a social enterprise  in the Netherlands with as stakeholder an own charity. Be More sends volunteers to community led project(orphanages, medical clinics, schools, hospices) in developing countries. They support projects in South Africa, Malawi, Uganda, Cambodia and the Philippines. As a volunteer you can work for at least 4 weeks at one of the partnerprojects of Be More. They guide you with all the preparations and with a Dutch regional coordinator they guide the volunteers during their trip in one of the country. They want to build a bridge between different cultures and want to create more awareness for people who have less opportunities in life. With the charity they support the local partnerprojects financially.

A lot of the partner projects work with orphaned children and/or people who have been infected/affected by HIV/AIDS
Two projects Be More worked with are Agape, a South African orphanage that is featured in the HBO documentary We Are Together (film) and The Blue Roof, a medical clinic that provides Antiretroviral drugs, counseling and support to people living with AIDS, which was opened by Alicia Keys and her charity Keep A Child Alive.

External links 
 Keep A Child Alive
 Be More

Development charities based in the Netherlands